The computer program par is a text formatting utility for Unix and Unix-like operating systems, written by Adam M. Costello as a replacement for the fmt command.

Par reformats paragraphs of text to fit into a given line length optimally, keeping prefixes and suffixes intact, which is useful for formatting source code comments. It also understands the conventions commonly used for quoting in email replies, and is capable of intelligently reformatting these several levels deep while rewrapping the text they quote.

Par can be invoked from text editors such as Vim or Emacs. To support Unicode par needs to be compiled with a patch that adds multi-byte character support, typically, UTF-8 encoding. Unlike fmt, par also supports text justification.

References
 Costello, Adam M. (2001). "par.doc". Accessed August 4, 2005.

External links

 
 Add multi-byte character support to par (Patch author's website). Archived November 24, 2021.
 Vimcasts.org: formatting text with par 
 Vim wikia: Par text reformatter

Unix text processing utilities